WWIII is KMFDM's thirteenth studio album, released on September 23, 2003. It follows the common KMFDM practice of naming albums with five-letter words. This is KMFDM's only release on Sanctuary Records. Lyrically, the album is very political. The songs primarily attack George W. Bush's presidency, various US wars in the Middle East, and America's foreign policy. The last track, "Intro", introduces the members of the band. It was recorded in Seattle, Washington. The album's first and eponymous single was featured in the game Saints Row: The Third.

Reception

WWIII received mixed reviews. The News-Times called it a "butt-rock masterpiece". David Jeffries of Allmusic said, "The most frustrating thing about WWIII is that it's so darn inconsistent."

Track listing

Personnel
Sascha Konietzko – programming, loops, synths, vocals (1–5, 7–9, 11), bass (1, 2, 4, 6, 7, 9, 10)
Jules Hodgson – guitar, programming (1, 3, 5, 8–11), bass (3, 5, 8), synths (1, 5), banjo (1), strings (3), piano (6, 8), drums (11)
Andy Selway – drums, vocals (11)
Lucia Cifarelli – vocals (1–5, 7–11)
Raymond Watts – vocals (2, 3, 6–8, 10, 11)
Bill Rieflin – drums (11), vocals (11), loops (4, 10)
Cheryl Wilson – vocals (6, 10)
Curt Golden – harmonica (8)
Mona Mur – "dominance" (5)

References

External links
 KMFDM DØTKØM WWIII lyrics at the official KMFDM website

2003 albums
KMFDM albums
Metropolis Records albums
Albums produced by Sascha Konietzko